Büyük means "big" in Turkic languages and may refer to:

People

Given name
 Büyük Jeddikar (born 1929), Iranian retired footballer
 Büyük Vatankhah (born 1943), Iranian retired footballer

Surname
 Adem Büyük (born 1987), Turkish footballer
 Musa Büyük (born 1980), Turkish footballer

Places
 Büyük Han, caravansarai in Cyprus
 Büyük Menderes River, river in southwestern Turkey, the ancient river Meander
 Büyük Saat, clock tower in Turkey

Media
 Büyük Düşler, fifth studio album of Turkish alternative rock band Mor ve Ötesi
 Büyük Teklif, Turkish version of Deal or No Deal
 Büyük Türkiye Partisi, short-lived Turkish  political party in 1983

See also
 Büyük ada (disambiguation), "big island"
 , since this is a common prefix
 Küçük (disambiguation), antonym, "small"

Turkish-language surnames
Turkish masculine given names
Turkish words and phrases